Phosphatidylinositol-4,5-bisphosphate 3-kinase catalytic subunit gamma isoform is an enzyme that in humans is encoded by the PIK3CG gene.

Function 

This gene encodes a protein that belongs to the pi3/pi4-kinase family of proteins. The gene product is an enzyme that phosphorylates phosphoinositides on the 3-hydroxyl group of the inositol ring. It is an important modulator of extracellular signals, including those elicited by E-cadherin-mediated cell-cell adhesion, which plays an important role in maintenance of the structural and functional integrity of epithelia. In addition to its role in promoting assembly of adherens junctions, the protein is thought to play a pivotal role in the regulation of cytotoxicity in NK cells. The gene is located in a commonly deleted segment of chromosome 7 previously identified in myeloid leukemias.

Interactions 

PIK3CG has been shown to interact with:
 BCR gene,
 KRAS, 
 PIK3CD,  and
 PIK3R5.

See also 
 Class I PI 3-kinases
 p87PIKAP

References

Further reading 

 
 

Cell signaling
EC 2.7.1